Megasphaeroceras is an ammonite genus included in Sphaeroceratidae, a family of ammonoid cephalopods characterized by their spheroidal shells with markedly eccentric coiling, fine ribbing, and complex sutures, known from the Bajocian.

References
Notes

Bibliography

Middle Jurassic ammonites
Ammonites of North America